Hans Melin is a Swedish orienteering competitor. He received a bronze medal in the relay event at the 1987 World Orienteering Championships in Gerardmer, together with Kent Olsson, Jörgen Mårtensson and Lars Lönnkvist.

References

Year of birth missing (living people)
Living people
Swedish orienteers
Male orienteers
Foot orienteers
World Orienteering Championships medalists